The 2007 Taça de Portugal Final was the final match of the 2006–07 Taça de Portugal, the 67th season of the Taça de Portugal, the premier Portuguese football cup competition organized by the Portuguese Football Federation (FPF). The match was played on 27 May 2007 at the Estádio Nacional in Oeiras, and opposed two Primeira Liga sides: Belenenses and Sporting CP. Sporting CP defeated Belenenses 1–0 to claim their fourteenth Taça de Portugal.

In Portugal, the final was televised live in HD on RTP1 and Sport TV. As Sporting CP claimed the Taça de Portugal, they qualified for the 2007 Supertaça Cândido de Oliveira, where they took on the winners of the 2006–07 Primeira Liga, Porto at the Estádio Dr. Magalhães Pessoa.

Match

Details

References

2007
2006–07 in Portuguese football
Sporting CP matches
C.F. Os Belenenses matches